The 1934–35 Campionat de Catalunya season was the 36th since its establishment and was played between 16 September and 25 November 1934.

Overview before the season
Six teams joined the Division One league, including two that would play the 1934–35 La Liga and four from the 1934–35 Segunda División.

From La Liga
Barcelona
Espanyol

From Segunda División

Badalona
Girona
Júpiter
Sabadell

Division One

League table

Results

Top goalscorers

Play-off league

Division Two

Group A

Group B

Group C

Final group

Copa Catalunya seasons
1934–35 in Spanish football